Dana Hooker (born 23 January 1991) is an Australian rules footballer playing for the West Coast Eagles in the AFL Women's (AFLW). She previously played for the Fremantle Football Club from 2017 to 2019. Hooker is a dual AFL Women's All-Australian, and was the inaugural Fremantle fairest and best winner in 2017 and inaugural West Coast Club Champion in 2020.

State league career
Hooker played with the Coastal Titans in the West Australian Women's Football League before missing a majority of the 2016 season after giving birth to her first child.

AFL Women's career

Fremantle (2017–2019)
In January 2017, she was voted into Fremantle's leadership group. Despite a disappointing season on the field for Fremantle, Hooker thrived and was named in Fremantle's best players in every match for the season and led the statistical counts at the club for disposals, kicks, marks and was second in inside-50s. Her performances during the season saw her win the inaugural Fremantle fairest and best award, and she was selected in the initial 40-woman squad for the 2017 AFL Women's All-Australian team.

Fremantle signed Hooker for the 2018 season during the trade period in May 2017.

Fremantle signed Hooker for the 2019 season during the trade and signing period in May 2018.

West Coast (2020–present)

In December, she was named vice-captain, supporting inaugural captain Emma Swanson.

Leading into the 2020 season, womens.afl journalist Sarah Black named Hooker at no. 4 on her list of the top 30 players in the AFLW. She made her West Coast debut in the club's inaugural game against  at Victoria Park in round 1, kicking the team's only goal for the game and achieving selection in womens.afls Team of the Week for that round. She was also selected in the Team of the Week in round 6, and was selected in the initial 40-woman squad for the 2020 AFL Women's All-Australian team. In August, Hooker was named the inaugural West Coast Club Champion.

Leading into the 2021 season, Sarah Black named Hooker at no. 12 on her annual list of the top 30 players in the AFLW.

She was West Coast's best player in its loss to Collingwood in round 6 and was among West Coast's best players in its loss to Richmond in round 7. Hooker suffered a shoulder injury in the second quarter of West Coast's loss to the Western Bulldogs in round 9.

Statistics
Updated to the end of S7 (2022).

|-
| 2017 ||  || 17
| 7 || 0 || 1 || 87 || 34 || 121 || 19 || 23 || 0.0 || 0.1 || 12.4 || 4.9 || 17.3 || 2.7 || 3.3 || 1
|-
| 2018 ||  || 17
| 7 || 5 || 1 || 86 || 37 || 123 || 11 || 33 || 0.7 || 0.1 || 12.3 || 5.3 || 17.6 || 1.6 || 4.7 || 9
|-
| 2019 ||  || 17
| 8 || 1 || 1 || 90 || 43 || 133 || 9 || 58 || 0.1 || 0.1 || 11.3 || 5.4 || 16.6 || 1.1 || 7.3 || 11
|-
| 2020 ||  || 17
| 6 || 1 || 0 || 85 || 33 || 118 || 16 || 41 || 0.2 || 0.0 || 14.2 || 5.5 || 19.7 || 2.7 || 6.9 || 6
|-
| 2021 ||  || 17
| 1 || 0 || 0 || 14 || 5 || 19 || 2 || 2 || 0.0 || 0.0 || 14.0 || 5.0 || 19.0 || 2.0 || 2.0 || 0
|-
| 2022 ||  || 17
| 9 || 2 || 1 || 99 || 47 || 146 || 18 || 30 || 0.2 || 0.1 || 11.0 || 5.2 || 16.2 || 2.0 || 3.3 || 3
|-
| S7 (2022) ||  || 17
| 10 || 1 || 1 || 87 || 30 || 117 || 25 || 38 || 0.1 || 0.1 || 8.7 || 3.0 || 11.7 || 2.5 || 3.8 || 0
|- class=sortbottom
! colspan=3 | Career
! 48 !! 10 !! 5 !! 548 !! 229 !! 777 !! 100 !! 225 !! 0.2 !! 0.1 !! 11.4 !! 4.8 !! 16.2 !! 2.1 !! 4.7 !! 30
|}

Honours and achievements
 2× AFL Women's All-Australian team: 2018, 2019
 Fremantle fairest and best: 2017
 West Coast Club Champion: 2020
 Allies representative honours in AFL Women's State of Origin: 2017

References

External links

 
 
 

Living people
1991 births
Australian rules footballers from Western Australia
Fremantle Football Club (AFLW) players
West Coast Eagles (AFLW) players
All-Australians (AFL Women's)